The men's 400 metres hurdles event at the 2006 Commonwealth Games was held on March 21–23.

Medalists

Results

Heats
Qualification: First 3 of each heat (Q) and the next 4 fastest (q) qualified for the semifinals.

Semifinals
Qualification: First 4 of each semifinal (Q) qualified directly for the final.

Final

References
Results

400
2006